Norma Beatriz Portillo Chévez (born 11 February 1992) is a Salvadoran footballer who plays as a defender. She has been a member of El Salvador women's national team.

International career
Ramírez capped for El Salvador at senior level during the 2010 CONCACAF Women's World Cup Qualifying qualification, the 2012 CONCACAF Women's Olympic Qualifying Tournament qualification and the 2013 Central American Games.

International goals
Scores and results list El Salvador's goal tally first.

See also
List of El Salvador women's international footballers

References

1992 births
Living people
Salvadoran women's footballers
Women's association football defenders
El Salvador women's international footballers